Edward Hawthorne Moren (December 25, 1825 – March 19, 1886) was the second Lieutenant Governor of Alabama. A Democrat, Moren served Governor Robert Burns Lindsay of the same political party, from 1870 to 1872.

Moren was raised in Dinwiddie County, Virginia by his parents Daniel and Mary Moren. His father, Daniel, was a State senator in Virginia for several terms. After graduating from medical school in New York, Edward Moren enlisted in the U.S. Army as an assistant surgeon, serving during the Mexican–American War. After leaving the U.S. army in 1848, Moren moved to Bibb County, Alabama where he continued to practice medicine. Over a decade later, in 1861, Moren was appointed to the upper house of the general assembly, in order to represent Perry and Bibb Counties. During his time in the upper house, Moren served on the Committee of Finance and Taxation as well as the Joint Committee of Retrenchment, as chairman.

After serving several terms in the upper house, Moren joined the Confederate States Army as a surgeon with the Twenty-ninth Alabama. In this position, Moren was charged with running a hospital in Greenville, Alabama. In 1870, Edward Moren was elected the second lieutenant governor of Alabama.

External links 
 Biography courtesy of the Alabama Department of Archives

Democratic Party Alabama state senators
Lieutenant Governors of Alabama
1825 births
1886 deaths
People of Alabama in the American Civil War
American military personnel of the Mexican–American War
Physicians from Virginia
Physicians from Alabama
People from Dinwiddie County, Virginia
People from Bibb County, Alabama
Politicians from Boston
American surgeons
19th-century American politicians